I Love You Hereafter - 2004-2009 Fish Leong's Hits is Fish Leong's second compilation album. It was released on 1 February 2011 by B'in Music and Universal Music Taiwan in a 2CD/DVD format, and the DVD includes 18 music videos. The new album is a "sequel" to her first greatest hits album The Power of Love that came out eight years ago.

The album features two new songs, namely "比較愛" (Compare Love) and "蔚藍海岸" (La Côte d'Azur), and 18 major hits from her six studio albums released from year 2004 to 2009.

Track listing

References

2011 compilation albums
Fish Leong albums
Mandopop albums